The Portuguese Singles Chart ranks the best-performing singles in Portugal, as compiled by the Associação Fonográfica Portuguesa.

See also 
 List of number-one albums of 2016 (Portugal)

References 

Portugal
Number one singles
Singles 2016